Nizi Project ( "Rainbow Project") is a 2020 Japanese reality competition show. The series is a joint project between JYP Entertainment and Sony Music Entertainment Japan with the intention of creating a Japanese girl group aimed at a global audience. Nizi Project is centered on JYP Entertainment founder Park Jin-young selecting members for the girl group out of 26 girls, who eventually debuted as NiziU.

Part 1 focused on the boot camp in 2019 with 26 contestants and was broadcast exclusively on Hulu Japan from January 31, 2020 to March 27, 2020. Part 2, which focused on the finals in 2020 between the top 14 contestants, was broadcast from May 22, 2020 to June 26, 2020. Beginning with Part 2, the series was also broadcast on YouTube.

A version of the show hosted by Daimaou Kosaka was broadcast on NTV from April 17, 2020 to June 26, 2020 under the title  and featured interviews with Park and the contestants of Nizi Project. An abridged version was serialized on the variety show  with live commentary from the show's panelists.

In July 2021, Park announced that Nizi Project will have a second season to create a 9-member Japanese boy band with a debut planned for March 2023.

Background

In February 2019, JYP Entertainment and Sony Music Entertainment Japan announced that they were creating an audition program titled Nizi Project to create a Japanese girl group aimed at a global audience, with plans for the group to debut in November 2020. Auditions for Japanese girls aged 15–22 years old opened on May 1, 2019 and were evaluated by a panel of judges. Approximately 10,231 people auditioned for the show. The second round of auditions took place from July to August 2019 in eight locations in Japan as well as Hawaii and Los Angeles, with 26 contestants selected by JYP Entertainment founder Park Jin-young. The 26 contestants attended a boot camp in Tokyo in September 2019 for four nights and five days. The top 14 contestants were sent to train in South Korea for six months in December 2019.

Each contestant selected by Park would be given a cube pendant based on the Nizi Project logo. Throughout the show, Park would evaluate each contestant in four different categories, with a triangular cube awarded to a contestant to fill her pendant if he felt she satisfied the category. A second set of cubes was introduced in Part 2, with four additional tests.

Part 1 was broadcast from January 31, 2020 to March 27, 2020 on Hulu Japan. Part 2 was broadcast from May 22, 2020 to June 26, 2020. In addition to Hulu Japan, the series was also uploaded to YouTube and an abridged version of the show was serialized through NTV's variety show , with live commentaries from the show's panelists. A version of the show, presented in the "perspective of the [host] and [Park] as the producers", was broadcast as a series of documentaries under the title ; the show was hosted by Daimaou Kosaka, with interviews from Park and the Nizi Project contestants, and was broadcast from April 17, 2020 to June 26, 2020. Prior to the finale of Part 2, Sukkiri ran a 25-minute feature of all the episodes from June 15 to June 26, 2020 on weekdays. A special feature of Nizi no Kake Hashi was broadcast on June 26, 2020, with announcer Keisuke Mori co-hosting the segment with Kosaka.

Contestants

Rankings

Summary

The top 9 finalists debuted as NiziU.

Color key

Part 1

Nizi Project Part 1 focused on the auditions in July and August 2019 and the Tokyo boot camp in September 2019.  Auditions opened on May 1, 2019 for girls aged 15–22 years old, with a total of 10,231 entries. The second round of auditions took place from July to August 2019 in Sapporo, Sendai, Tokyo, Nagoya, Osaka, Hiroshima, Fukuoka, and Okinawa, as well as Hawaii and Los Angeles in the United States. During the second auditions, Park and a panel of judges selected 26 contestants, which they awarded with Nizi pendants, and they would attend a boot camp in Tokyo that lasted four nights and five days.

During the boot camp, the contestants were evaluated under four categories: dance, vocals, X factor, and personality. If Park felt a contestant satisfied one of the categories, he would award her a triangular cube to fill her Nizi pendant.

Auditions

Cube 1: Dance

For the dance evaluation, yellow cubes were awarded to the top 3 contestants, with additional cubes awarded to the rest of the top 16 contestants.

Cube 2: Vocal

For the vocal evaluation, green cubes were awarded to 7 contestants, with additional cubes awarded to the rest of the top 13 contestants.

Cube 3: X factor

For the X factor evaluation, red cubes were awarded to 8 contestants, with additional cubes awarded to 4 others.

Cube 4: Personality

The final performance of the Tokyo boot camp consisted of a group performance with the song assigned by Park. The showcase was evaluated by Park and Twice members Sana and Momo. Contestants had an opportunity to appeal and be awarded any of the first three cubes missed as they perform in the showcase in episodes 9 and 10.

Afterwards, the contestants were awarded blue cubes for personality based on feedback from the trainers, staff, and the answers that the contestants provided on their questionnaires. The contestants with 3 or more cubes were allowed to proceed to the boot camp in South Korea.

Part 2

The top 14 contestants qualified to attend a boot camp in South Korea for six months, beginning in December 2019. During the next set of evaluations, Park revealed an additional set of four cubes to award to the contestants based on growth, teamwork, image, and a final overall grade. If a contestant ranks in the bottom twice, she is automatically eliminated.

Cube 5: Growth

In episodes 11 to 13, for the fifth cube, Park evaluated each contestant through the Individual Level Test, assessing her individual improvement. Each contestant chose her own song and performance. The winners of this round are Miihi Suzuno (1st), Mako Yamaguchi (2nd), Riku Oe (3rd), and Maya Katsumura (4th). Everyone else within the top 9 also received cubes as runner-ups. The bottom 4 contestants did not receive cubes, and Akari Inoue (13th) ranked last.

Cube 6: Teamwork

In episodes 14 and 15, for the sixth cube, Park assessed the contestants based on teamwork. Songs and heats were assigned randomly. Mako Yamaguchi's team won the first round, while Miihi Suzuno's team won the second round, with both teams earning cubes. Additional cubes were granted to Riku Oe (4th), Akari Inoue (5th), and Nina Hillman (9th) as runner-ups. The remaining contestants did not receive cubes, and Momoka Hirai (13th) ranked last.

Extreme Sports Fest

In episodes 15 and 16, the contestants are invited on a day out under the pretense of having a picnic, only for it to be a sports festival aimed to foster their physical endurance and artistic expressions. The Extreme Sports Fest was hosted by 2PM member Wooyoung with Ji Suk-woo as his Japanese interpreter.

The contestants are split into two teams: the Pink Team, consisting of Mako Yamaguchi (leader), Ayaka Arai, Yuna, Mayuka Ogou, Rima Yokoi, Riria Ikematsu, and Riku Oe; and the Mint Team, consisting of Rio Hanabashi (leader), Miihi Suzuno, Akari Inoue, Maya Katsumura, Momoka Hirai, and Nina Hillman. The pink team won, earning tickets to an amusement park.

Cube 7: Image

In episodes 17 and 18, for the seventh cube, Park assigned the groups each a song he felt would suit their image. Maya Katsumura's team won, with all team members receiving cubes. Additional cubes were awarded to Mako Yamaguchi (1st), Rio Hanabashi (2nd), Mayuka Ogou (3rd), Rima Yokoi (6th), Nina Hillman (8th), and Riria Ikematsu (9th) as runner-ups. Momoka Hirai (13th) was eliminated for ranking last in two rounds.

Cube 8: Finals

In episodes 19 and 20, the finals were split into two rounds for the final cube, which determined whether the contestant was selected for the debuting girl group. The groups were evaluated by Park, 2PM member Wooyoung and Twice member Momo.

In both rounds, the teams would perform new songs originally composed by Park. For the first round, Mako Yamaguchi's team performed "Beyond the Rainbow" and Maya Katsumura's team performed "Boom Boom Boom", with Katsumura's team winning. In the second round, both teams performed "Make You Happy", with Yamaguchi's team winning. During the rank announcements, Park announced the top 9 contestants, who were chosen to debut in NiziU.

Aftermath
 The top 9 finalists debuted as NiziU.

 Some trainees formed/joined with groups:
 Kyoka Taniya debuted in Give & Give, a girl group managed by CyberAgent.
 Ririka Kishida debuted in ILY:1, a South Korean girl group managed by FC ENM.
 Some trainees participated in other survival shows:
 Ririka Kishida and Miu Sakurai competed in Mnet's reality competition program, Girls Planet 999, as members of its Japanese division, J-Group.

Sequel
On July 12, 2021, Park held a press conference announcing that Nizi Project will have a second season to create a 9-member Japanese boy band set for debut in March 2023. Applications for boys from 14 to 22 years old are open from July 2021 to October 2021. Auditions will take place from November to December 2021 in eight cities in Japan, as well as New York and Los Angeles in the United States, and Seoul in South Korea. The contestants will be evaluated in five categories: vocal, dance, rap, modeling, and composing/lyricism. The members for the group will be finalized and announced in December 2022.

Notes

References

External links
  
 Nizi Kake no Hashi

Hulu Japan
Japanese music television series
Reality competition television series
Television series by JYP Entertainment